The Clark R. Griggs House is a historic house located at 505 W. Main St. in Urbana, Illinois. The house was built in 1871 by Clark Robinson Griggs; Griggs was a railroad developer who served as Urbana's mayor and was a key figure in establishing the University of Illinois at Urbana–Champaign in the city. Griggs never lived in the house he built, and his son occupied the house after Griggs moved east. The Italianate house is one of the few examples of the style in Urbana. The house's cornice is decorated with paired brackets, as is a projecting bay on the east side. The front porch has a balustrade and is supported by bracketed columns.

The house was added to the National Register of Historic Places on November 30, 1978.

References

Houses on the National Register of Historic Places in Illinois
Italianate architecture in Illinois
Houses completed in 1871
Houses in Champaign County, Illinois
Buildings and structures in Urbana, Illinois
National Register of Historic Places in Champaign County, Illinois